The Far Country is a 1954 American Technicolor Western film directed by Anthony Mann and starring James Stewart, Ruth Roman, Walter Brennan, John McIntire and Corinne Calvet. Written by Borden Chase, the film is about a self-minded adventurer who locks horns with an evil, corrupt judge while driving cattle to Dawson, Yukon Territory. It is one of the few Westerns to be set in Alaska—others include The Spoilers and North to Alaska -- although it was not filmed there. This was the fourth Western film collaboration between Anthony Mann and James Stewart. The supporting cast features Jay C. Flippen, Harry Morgan, Steve Brodie, Robert J. Wilke, Chubby Johnson, Royal Dano and Jack Elam.

Plot
In 1896, Jeff Webster hears of the Klondike Gold Rush and he and friend Ben Tatem decide to drive a herd of cattle to Dawson City, Yukon. On the way, he annoys self-appointed Judge Gannon by interrupting a hanging in Skagway, so Gannon unilaterally confiscates his herd. After signing on to assist in taking supplies to Dawson, Jeff and Ben return to town to take the animals back to make them a part of the caravan and take off with Gannon and his men in hot pursuit. After crossing the border into Canada, Jeff uses a few well-placed warning shots to persuade Gannon's gang to give up the chase, but the judge promises to hang Jeff when he returns through Skagway.

When Jeff gets to Dawson, he finds a widespread benign lawlessness, and ignores it as none of his business. He auctions off his herd for $2 per pound ($/lb today) to new arrival Ronda Castle who had hired him, a saloon owner and one of Gannon's business associates, when she outbids Hominy, Grits and Molasses, co-owners of the local hash house. Both Ronda and French-Canadian gamine Renee Vallon are strongly attracted to Jeff. Now looking for their next adventure, Jeff and Ben use $40,000 ($ million today) of their proceeds to buy an existing gold claim, soon doubling their money.

Ronda sets up a saloon in partnership with Gannon, who begins cheating the miners out of their claims. Gannon and his gunmen show up to grab their share (and then some), making Dawson much more dangerous. Jeff stays out of it, instead planning to sneak out by river while Gannon is otherwise occupied. However, Gannon is tipped off when Ben buys extra coffee for the long trip; his men kill Ben and wound Jeff, finally forcing him to take sides.

Jeff calls Gannon out to settle the dispute man to man, but the villain arranges an ambush. Ronda rushes out to warn Jeff and is fatally shot in the back. Jeff kills Gannon in the ensuing gunfight and the rest of his gang agree to leave town, rather than fight all the fed-up longtime residents, who have finally found their courage and have armed themselves to directly face and resist the gang.

Cast

 James Stewart as Jeff Webster
 Ruth Roman as Ronda Castle
 Corinne Calvet as Renee Vallon
 Walter Brennan as Ben Tatem
 John McIntire as Judge Gannon
 Jay C. Flippen as Marshal Rube Morris
 Harry Morgan as Ketchum
 Steve Brodie as Ives
 Connie Gilchrist as Hominy
 Robert J. Wilke as Madden
 Chubby Johnson as Dusty
 Royal Dano as Luke
 Eugene Borden as Dr Vallon
 Jack Elam as Newberry
 Eddy Waller as Yukon Sam
 Kathleen Freeman as Grits
 Connie Van as Molasses

Historical background
The character of Gannon may be loosely based on that of Soapy Smith, a confidence artist and gang leader who ran the town of Skagway during the Alaska Gold Rush.  He was killed in a gunfight, although not as shown in the movie. The cattle were driven to Seattle, shipped to Skagway, and then driven further to Dawson, to total about 1,500 miles driven distance.

Production
Filming locations
 Athabasca Glacier, Alberta, Canada 
 Jasper National Park, Alberta, Canada

Reception
The film was first released in the summer of 1954 throughout the UK. It would be released in the US in February 1955.
Stewart took a percentage of the profits. In 1955, William Goetz estimated that Stewart had earned $300,000 from the film.

See also
 List of American films of 1954

References

External links

 
 
 
 

1954 films
1954 Western (genre) films
American Western (genre) films
1950s English-language films
Films directed by Anthony Mann
Films scored by Henry Mancini
Films set in 1896
Films set in Alaska
Films set in Yukon
Films shot in Alberta
Northern (genre) films
Universal Pictures films
Films about the Klondike Gold Rush
Revisionist Western (genre) films
1950s American films